Akhta may refer to:
Akhta, Sitamarhi, a village in Sitamarhi district, Bihar, India
Akhta Uttar, a gram panchayat in Sitamarhi district, Bihar, India
Akhta, Vayots Dzor, a village in Vayots Dzor Province, Armenia